Joel West Flood (August 2, 1894 – April 27, 1964), the brother of Henry De La Warr Flood and uncle of Harry Flood Byrd, was a Virginia lawyer and judge and briefly United States Representative from Virginia.

Early and family life
He was born near Appomattox, Appomattox County, Virginia on August 2, 1894, to former CSA Major and Virginia General Assembly member Joel Walker Flood (1839-1916) and his second (or third) wife, Sallie Whiteman Delk, whom he had married in Philadelphia in 1892. Joel Flood had an elder half siblings Eleanor Bolling Flood Byrd (1864-1957)) and Henry De La Warr Flood (1866 -1921). He attended public schools in Appomattox and Richmond, Virginia, before receiving an undergraduate degree from Washington and Lee University. He also attended the University of Virginia School of Law (receiving a law degree) and Oxford University.

Career

After his father's death and his own admission to the Virginia bar in 1917, Flood began a legal practice in Appomattox, Virginia. He also took over what remained of the family plantation. During World War I, Flood served from March 29, 1918, until his discharge July 18, 1919, as a private in Company A, Three Hundred and Fifth Engineers, Eightieth Division.

Appomattox County voters elected Flood Commonwealth attorney in 1919, a position once held by his elder half-brother Henry D. Flood. He was re-elected multiple times and served until November 8, 1932. Also, upon returning to Virginia, Flood became a member of the unofficial Byrd Organization created by his nephew Harry F. Byrd upon the demise of Sen. Thomas Staples Martin. Joel Flood also served as an assistant to Governor E. Lee Trinkle of Virginia in 1922–1926, and as special assistant to the Attorney General of Virginia from April 1, 1928, to July 1, 1932.

Elected to Congress as a Democrat to fill the vacancy caused by the death of Henry St. George Tucker, he served from November 8, 1932, to March 3, 1933 (in the Seventy-second Congress). The seat was eliminated due to restructuring after the 1930 census. Flood was not a candidate for election to the Seventy-third Congress, but returned to his legal practice and agricultural pursuits. He also served as a delegate to the Democratic National Convention in 1936. He was appointed assistant United States attorney for the Western District of Virginia and served from June 1, 1939, to January 28, 1940. Virginia legislators elected him as a judge of the fifth judicial circuit of Virginia in January 1940, in which capacity he served until his death.

Death and legacy
Joel Flood died in the Richmond Veterans Administration hospital Chesterfield, Virginia on April 27, 1964, of pneumonia and a heart condition, survived by his widow, Dorothy E. Flood. He is interred in the Flood Mausoleum, Appomattox Courthouse Square.

References

1894 births
1964 deaths
County and city Commonwealth's Attorneys in Virginia
Virginia lawyers
Washington and Lee University alumni
Democratic Party members of the United States House of Representatives from Virginia
University of Virginia School of Law alumni
Alumni of the University of Oxford
People from Appomattox County, Virginia